Víctor Pecci and Balázs Taróczy were the defending champions but did not compete that year.

Bob Hewitt and Frew McMillan won in the final 6–4, 3–6, 6–1 against Brian Gottfried and Raúl Ramírez.

Seeds
The draw allocated unseeded teams at random; as a result two seeded teams received byes into the second round.

Draw

Final

Top half

Bottom half

External links
 1979 Fischer-Grand Prix Doubles draw

1979 Fischer-Grand Prix